Vitaly Sergeyevich Marakhovsky (born 14 January 1988) is a Russian former professional football player.

Club career
He made his Russian Football National League debut for FC Zvezda Irkutsk on 27 March 2008 in a game against FC Anzhi Makhachkala.

External links
 
 

1988 births
Living people
Russian footballers
Association football defenders
Russian expatriate footballers
Expatriate footballers in Belarus
FC Lokomotiv Moscow players
FC SKA Rostov-on-Don players
FC Zvezda Irkutsk players
FC Armavir players
FC Dinamo Minsk players
FC Dynamo Bryansk players
FC Tekstilshchik Ivanovo players
FC Slutsk players
FC Vitebsk players
FC Naftan Novopolotsk players
FC Belshina Bobruisk players
FC Avangard Kursk players
Belarusian Premier League players
People from Armavir, Russia
Sportspeople from Krasnodar Krai